Ins and Outs is an album by Argentine composer, pianist and conductor Lalo Schifrin recorded in 1982 and released on the Palo Alto label.

Reception
The Allmusic review stated "Schifrin had a rare opportunity to stretch out on piano... other than "Manteca," the emphasis is on easy-listening jazz. Nice music but not overly memorable".

Track listing
All compositions by Lalo Schifrin except as indicated
 "Ins and Outs" - 5:03    
 "Con Alma" (Dizzy Gillespie) - 5:10   
 "Love Poem for Donna" - 5:03  
 "Down Here on the Ground" - 4:36  
 "Manteca" (Gillespie, Chano Pozo, Gil Fuller) - 4:13     
 "Paraphrase" - 4:14   
 "Brazilian Impressions" - 4:28    
 "The Fox" - 4:55  
Recorded in Hollywood, California on March 29 & 30, 1982

Personnel
Lalo Schifrin - piano, arranger
Sam Most - flutes
Andy Simpkins - bass
Earl Palmer - drums
Paulinho Da Costa - percussion

References

Palo Alto Records albums
Lalo Schifrin albums
1982 albums
Albums arranged by Lalo Schifrin